Tennis at the 2019 African Games was held from 23 to 31 August 2019 in Rabat, Morocco.

The event served as a qualifier for the 2020 Summer Olympics in Tokyo, Japan.

Participating nations

Medalists

Men

Women

Medal table

References

External links 
 Results

 
2019 African Games
African Games
African Games
2019 African Games
2019